Scuffletown may refer to:

Scuffletown, Bullitt County, Kentucky
Scuffletown, Henderson County, Kentucky
Scuffletown, Virginia
Surry, Virginia, former name
Scuffletown, North Carolina